The 2018 McNeese State Cowboys football team represented McNeese State University in the 2018 NCAA Division I FCS football season. The Cowboys were led by third-year head coach Lance Guidry and played their home games at Cowboy Stadium. They were a member of the Southland Conference. They finished the season 6–5, 5–4 in Southland play to finish in a four-way tie for fourth place.

On November 20, head coach Lance Guidry was fired. He finished at McNeese State with a three-year record of 21–12.

Previous season
The Cowboys finished the 2017 season 9–2, 7–2 in Southland play to finish in a tie for third place. They did not receive an at-large birth to the FCS Playoffs.

Preseason

Preseason All-Conference Teams
On July 12, 2018, the Southland announced their Preseason All-Conference Teams, with the Cowboys having ten players selected.

Offense First Team
 David Hamm – Sr. RB
 Lawayne Ross – Jr. TE
 Gunnar Raborn – Sr. K
 Alex Kjellsten – Sr. P

Defense First Team
 BJ Blunt – Sr. LB

Offense Second Team
 James Tabary – Sr. QB
 Grant Burguillos – Jr. OL

Defense Second Team
 Chris Livings – Jr. DL
 Darion Dunn – So. DB
 Colby Burton – Jr. DB

Preseason Poll
On July 19, 2018, the Southland announced their preseason poll, with the Cowboys predicted to finish in fourth place.

Roster

Schedule

Game summaries

at Northern Colorado

Nicholls

at BYU

Stephen F. Austin

Abilene Christian

at Incarnate Word

Central Arkansas

at Southeastern Louisiana

at Northwestern State

Lamar

Ranking movements

References

McNeese State
McNeese Cowboys football seasons
McNeese State Cowboys football